"Child" is the debut solo single of Take That band member Mark Owen, released on 18 November 1996. It was the first single to be released from Owen's debut album, Green Man (1996). He told in an interview, "It was the first song I wrote, and while I was writing the others I always knew it was going to be the first." The Beatles-influenced track peaked at number three on the UK Singles Chart, making it the joint-most successful single of his whole solo career. It was certified silver and sold over 200,000 copies. The song reached number one in Lithuania, Spain, and Taiwan and peaked within the top 10 in Austria, Belgium, Czech Republic, Denmark, Ireland, and Switzerland. "Child" was available on both CD and Cassette formats.

Critical reception
Pan-European magazine Music & Media described "Child" as "a subtle ballad, full of genuine emotions, which will pull everyone's heartstrings." A reviewer from Music Week rated it five out of five, adding, "Already one of the favourites for the Christmas number one slot, this ballad has hints of early Seventies John Lennon and should appeal to the teenies and their parents. A surefire hit." Pop Rescue stated that "it’s a great song, that orchestrally, lyrically, and vocally shines here."

Track listings

 UK CD1
 "Child"
 "Confused"
 "Home"
 "Child" (acoustic version)

 UK CD2
 "Child"
 "Confused"
 "Child" (instrumental)

 UK cassette single
 "Child"
 "Confused"

 European CD single
 "Child" (radio edit)
 "Confused"

 Australian and Japanese CD single
 "Child" (radio edit)
 "Child" (full length)
 "Confused"
 "Home"

Charts

Weekly charts

Year-end charts

References

1996 debut singles
1996 songs
Bertelsmann Music Group singles
Mark Owen songs
Number-one singles in Spain
RCA Records singles
Songs written by Mark Owen
Songs written by Martin Brammer